USS Mira has been the name of two proposed United States Navy ships:

 , a motor launch scheduled for World War I use as a patrol boat in 1918, but never commissioned
 , a cargo ship acquired 6 November 1943 but transferred without being commissioned to the United States Army the next day, where she served as the U.S. Army Engineer Port Repair Ship Robert M. Emery

United States Navy ship names